The Ghulam Ishaq Khan Institute of Engineering Sciences and Technology (commonly referred as GIKI), is a private research university located in Topi, Khyber Pakhtunkhwa in Pakistan. The institute has a  campus that is located in the vicinity of Swabi District.

It was founded by the former President of Pakistan, Ghulam Ishaq Khan, in 1993. Since its establishment, the institute has consistently attracted the country's most influential scientists such as Abdul Qadeer Khan, Asghar Qadir, and Shaukat Hameed Khan, who played a role in elevating the institute as one of world's finest science and engineering college. GIKI is known to be a competitive institution with a low acceptance rate requiring students to show extraordinary academic excellence and capabilities with strong financial footing to be accommodated.

GIK is one of the top institutions ranked by the Higher Education Commission (HEC).

History

The GIK Institute is a private educational institution, named after former bureaucrat and former President of Pakistan Ghulam Ishaq Khan. The project was delegated to Pakistani scientist, Dr. Abdul Qadeer Khan, who was one of the founding members of the institute and was once registered as an associate professor of physics. The genesis of the Institute can be traced back to the early 1950s when Mr. Ghulam Ishaq Khan (late) became acutely aware of Pakistan's dependence on foreign expertise and imported technology. Out of his frequent interaction with the foreign and local experts emerged the idea that a center of excellence in engineering sciences and production technology ought to be established in the country, a center whose standards of education are comparable to those of its counterparts in the advanced countries. The transformation of this idea into a practical proposition took place in December 1985 when the Benevolent Community Care and Infaq Foundation donated Rs. 50 million for setting up an institute in the Khyber Pakhtunkhwa for promotion of science and technology.

Major founding donors include Nouman Benevolent Community Care, Infaq Foundation, Chiniot Anjuman-e-Islamia, Dawood Group of Industries, and the Government of the Khyber-Pakhtunkhwa which has donated land at Topi.

A milestone in the evolution of the institute was the registration in June, 1988 of its parent body, namely, Society for the Promotion of Engineering Sciences and Technology in Pakistan (SOPREST). Mr. Ghulam Ishaq Khan (late), then the President of the country, was elected the President of the Society for life and Mr. H. U. Beg was appointed its Honorary Executive Director and Mr. Samiullah Marwat the first full-time Secretary.

The task of conceiving and formulating the basic form and features of the institute was entrusted to a group of eminent scientists and engineers. These professionals started transformation of the dream into reality at a galloping pace. The civil works at the campus site were started in early 1990. An interim office of the institute was set up in August 1992 where senior professionals with outstanding backgrounds worked in a cohesive group to evolve the educational aims and philosophy of the institute, its curricula and details of state-of-the-art equipment for its laboratories and workshops.
In March 1993 an "Ordinance" was promulgated by the Khyber-Pakhtunkhwa (Provincial) Government for the establishment of the Institute under the umbrella of SOPREST, and the first batch of students was inducted the same year in October. Since an Ordinance has a limited life, it was ratified through an "Act" by the Provincial Assembly in July 1994.

The Institute symbolizes the immense altruism and concern for collective welfare that exists in the private sector. It is the first privately funded institute of its kind in the country and dedicated to bringing our engineering education at par with the advanced countries. The tuition fee has to be in consonance with the high cost of education. However, what the students are charged hardly covers the annual expenditure. Total capital outlay of the institute to-date on historical cost basis works out to more than Rs. 2.5 billion for which funds were mobilized from diverse sources including a major donation of Rs. 750 million from Infaq Foundation and land measuring  donated by the Government of Khyber Pakhtunkhwa.

In 1998, the Clinton Administration sanctioned the GIKI for alleged unspecified involvement in nuclear or missile activities.

Campus 
The institute has a  campus that is located in the vicinity of Swabi District.

Location 
The university is situated beside the river Indus in the mountains of Tarbela and Gadoon-Amazai, in the Khyber-Pakhtunkhwa near the town of Topi and in proximity to the lakes of Tarbela Dam (world's largest earth-filled dam)  and Ghazi.
Its campus is in the mountains of Tarbela and Gadoon-Amazai, and is a residential campus with accommodation for students.

Landmarks

Clock tower 

Clock Tower, (Landmark of Ghulam Ishaq Khan, aka LoGIK in short), is located in Ghulam Ishaq Khan Institute of Engineering Sciences and Technology, Topi, Khyber Pakhtunkhwa, Pakistan. Amidst all the picturesque buildings of the institute stands erect the Clock Tower in all its glory. The clock tower can be seen from almost everywhere in the institute and has clocks on all four of its sides. It is the tallest structure in the area visible for many miles, and it provides a view of Tarbela Dam and the surrounding areas of Topi. It unites the institute on one time, and the student community is particularly fond of it.

Central Library 
Initially, the library was housed in the Faculty of Metallurgy and Material Engineering (now Faculty of Material Science and Engineering). The construction of the main library building was started and completed in 1996. It is a stately three-story building, situated at the foothill of hills near Tarbela Dam.

Agha Hasan Abedi Auditorium 
The Agha Hasan Abedi (AHA) Auditorium is named after Agha Hasan Abedi. It occupies the central place in the campus. It has a seating capacity of 535, and is a venue of conferences, seminars, debates, declamation contests, concerts, and other such functions.

Admissions 
Admission to the university is based on the entry test. For BS programs, the syllabus for GIK Institute Admissions Test comprises Physics, Mathematics, and English based on Pakistan's Intermediate level syllabus. Eligibility criteria for admission to the university are at least 60% marks in physics and mathematics in FSc or Grade D in A levels. Entry test for the university is very competitive as a large number of prospective students compete for a limited number of seats. Starting in 2022, the institute shifted to taking online admission tests.

Rankings
The institute has been ranked number one in Pakistan and 30th internationally in Quality Education and has an overall ranking of 601-800th by The Times Higher Education in the World University Impact Rankings 2021.

The Institute has been ranked third in the province of KPK, 22nd in Pakistan, 532nd Globally by  UI Green Metric Rankings 2021.

The university was given a "Reporter" status on The Times Higher Education World University Rankings 2022 and Young University Rankings 2022.

Faculties and Departments

Faculty of Engineering Sciences 

The Faculty offers a 4-year degree program leading to Bachelor of Science in Engineering Sciences which encompasses some of the modern fields of engineering such as:

 Lasers and Electro-Optics
 Semiconductors and Superconducting Devices
 Modelling and Simulations

The faculty also offers MS and PHD degree programs in applied mathematics and applied physics.

Faculty of Computer Science and Electrical Engineering 

Faculty of Electrical Engineering and Faculty of Computer Science and Engineering share the same department building.

Faculty of Electrical Engineering 
It offers four year BS degree program in Electrical Engineering with following specializations:
Electronic Engineering
Power Engineering
Faculty Thrust Areas:
Communication and Digital Signal Processing
Microelectronics and ASIC Design
Electric Power and Control Systems

Faculty of Computer Science and Engineering 
The Faculty offers courses leading to Bachelor's (BS) in Computer Engineering, Artificial Intelligence, Data Science, and Computer Science. It also offers a Master's (MS) and a Doctor of Philosophy (Ph.D.) Degrees in Computer Systems Engineering.

On 6 July 2020, Ghulam Ishaq Khan Institute of Engineering Sciences and Technology, in collaboration with Huawei, launched its Bachelor of Science program in Artificial Intelligence.

Ghulam Ishaq Khan Institute introduced its programs of Data Science in 2021 and Cyber Security in 2022.

Faculty of Mechanical Engineering 

Faculty of Mechanical Engineering at the University of Ghulam Ishaq Khan Institute of Engineering Sciences & Technology aspires to produce technically sound and professionally mature Mechanical Engineers to cater our National needs in the 21st century. We seek to enrich our educational and research programs, and ultimately society, through service. The Faculty of Mechanical Engineering at GIK has a well-balanced and modern curricula designed both for the professional and the R&D / research engineer. Drawing on all classical disciplines such as mechanics and materials, drawing/drafting, thermal and fluid sciences, design and control. Curricula also reflect the latest advances in Finite Element Methods, Computational Fluid Dynamics, Computer Aided Design and Drafting (CADD), Numerical Control Machines and Energy Management. Modern labs, workshops and demonstration facilities complement the futuristic curricula. The center of Energy and Environment studies (CEES) has already gained national and international exposure through its various workshops and conferences. The Centre for Manufacturing Productivity and Technology Transfer (CMPT) is a multidisciplinary research / R&D Centre aimed at bridging the gap between industry and academia, especially in manufacturing domain. Anticipating the technological scenario of the 21st century, the faculty provides an enjoyable and exciting academic experience.

Faculty of Materials and Chemical Engineering 
The Faculty offers two 4-year bachelor's degree programs licensed by the PEC detailing basic principles & mathematics of process operations in the first two years. Third & final year deal with the advanced level of the field closely selected to cope the industrial requirements. Materials Engineering degree program is focused towards understanding of materials, their processing and characteristics. Chemical Engineering program deals with understanding of chemical engineering principles and their use in the industrial processing of various chemicals.

Materials Engineering program offers following specialization streams:

 Specialization in Manufacturing
 Specialization in Nanotechnology

Faculty of Civil Engineering 
Ghulam Ishaq Khan Institute introduced its program of Civil Engineering in 2018. The department offers a four years BS Civil Engineering program.

Faculty of Management Sciences and Humanities 
Degree program at undergraduate level has started from 2013. 
This Faculty offers 4 year BS Management Science degree with specialization in:
 Marketing & Entrepreneurship
 Accounting & Finance
 Supply Chain Management
 Project Management

International Advisory Board
The advisory board consists of scientists, engineers and academicians who are monitoring the institute's standard of education and research. It comprises faculty members from Kansas State University, Kyoto University, McGill University, University of Florida, University of Illinois at Urbana–Champaign and other institutions.

Labs and facilities

High Performance Computing Cluster

HPC platform has been donated to GIK Institute by the Directorate of Science and Technology (DoST) KPK Pakistan. It is a compute-intensive platform and has the following hardware components:

 Front Node: Dell R815 with 64 CPU cores, 256GB RAM, 1.8TB Secondary Memory 
 3 Compute Nodes: Dell R175 each with 32 CPU cores/ compute node  (96 in total), 128GB RAM/ compute node (384GB in total), 600GB Secondary Memory/ compute node (1.8TB in total). 
 NVIDIA Tesla M2090 Graphical. 
 Dell Power Connect 8024F layer-3 manageable switch: Front Node and the Compute Nodes are connected to each other using this switch.

Catalyst Incubator 
GIK Institute established its own startup Incubator in 2014 with the aim to motivate entrepreneurial skills among the students. The incubator will provide facilities and technical assistance, working space, and other services to incubate the startup initiatives by the participants. It will also help them get venture capitalists to convert their fledgling startups into mature ones.

In 2015, GIK incubator received funding of 100 million PKR from the Directorate of Science and Technology, Ministry of ST & IT, Govt of Khyber Pakhtunkhuwa. The grant was given in order to develop entrepreneurship through the establishment and strengthening of Technology Incubation center.

Notable alumni
 Yarjan Abdul Samad, First Pakistani space scientist to work at University of Cambridge.
Taimur Khan Jhagra, Provincial Minister of Finance for Khyber Pakhtunkhuwa and former Mckinsey Partner.
Muhammad Hamza Shafqaat, Former Deputy Commissioner Islamabad.

Student life

Societies and clubs 
The institute offers opportunities for students to participate in technical and professional societies. Study trips to industries and organizations are arranged, guest speakers from institutes and industries are invited and seminars and workshops are held. Sports facilities are available on the campus. Each faculty in the institute supports professional organizations, devoted to advancing the theory and practice of their fields. There are also societies that have been created for non-technical purposes and do not represent any particular faculty.

Popular societies 
ACM GIK Student Chapter
AIAA – American Institute of Aeronautics and Astronautics
AIESEC
ASHRAE – American Society of Heat Refrigeration and Air Conditioning Engineer
ASM/TMS – American Society for Materials or The Mineral, Metal & Material Society
ASME – American Society of Mechanical Engineers
CDES – Cultural Dramatics and Entertainment Society
GIK Institute Consulting Group
GSS – GIK Sports Society
GMS – GIK Mathematics Society
GSS – Graduate Students Society
IET Institute of Engineering and Technology – GIK Students Chapter
IEEE – GIK Student Branch
IEEE – Women In Engineering (WIE)
LDS – Literary and Debating Society
LES - The Leadership and Entrepreneurship Society
MediaClub 
NAQSH – Arts Society
NETRONiX – Society of student administrators maintaining GIK's local area network
Project Topi
GSS – GIK Science Society
Scribes – Writing Team
SMEP – Society of Mechanical Engineers of Pakistan
SOPHEP – Society for the Promotion of Higher Education Pakistan
SPIE – Society for Photo-optical Instrumentation Engineers
WES – Women Engineers Society

Technical Teams 

 The GIK WebTeam - The team designs and maintains the institute's official website. 
 Team Invictus - The only team that represents Pakistan in the international Design/Build/Fly Competition annually held in the United States.
 Team Hammerhead Arc 
 Team Urban
Formula GIK Team Infinity - GIK Institute's only team representing at the FSUK of IMechE held annually at Silverstone, United Kingdom.
 GIKI Rocket Engineering Team (GRET) - The team represents Pakistan at Spaceport America Cup - an international intercollegiate rocketry competition annually held in New Mexico, US. 
 Team Foxtrot
 Team Lambda - GIK Institute's Machine Learning and Data Science team.

Sports 
The campus has its own sports facilities. Courts for indoor games and activities such as table tennis, badminton, and squash are available on the campus. Tennis, basketball and volleyball courts, football and cricket grounds are also present. The sports complex also features a swimming pool and gymnasium.

See also
 List of engineering universities in Pakistan
 List of accidents and incidents involving military aircraft (2000–09)#2008 – for the aircraft crash at campus.

References

External links
 Official GIK Institute's Website
 The GIK WebTeam 
 Satellite image on Wikimapia

Ghulam Ishaq Khan Institute of Engineering Sciences and Technology
1993 establishments in Pakistan
Educational institutions established in 1993
Bank of Credit and Commerce International